The penny knife was a originally a simple 18th century utility knife with a fixed blade.  It got the name penny knife because it cost 1 penny in England and America towards the end of the 18th century.

The famous Fuller's Penny Knife helped gain the reputation of Sheffield, England, cutlers in the pre-industrial era of the early 18th century.

Description

The penny knife later evolved into a basic, mass-produced pocketknife with a folding blade, which pivoted freely in and out of the handle without a backspring or other device to hold it in position (other than the frictional pressures of the knife handle).  This type of knife was popular with farmers in the United States, England, France, Italy, Portugal, and Spain for much of the 19th and part of the 20th century, and consequently is often called a farmer knife, sodbuster knife, or peasant knife.

Antique penny knives have increased in value and can sell for up to US $500 or 400 Euros.

In modern production, the smallest models of the Opinel, a late 19th-century peasant's knife, continue to use this basic design, consisting of a folding blade pivoting on an axle mounted through a steel-bolstered wooden handle.

The Svord company from New Zealand also sells a range of simple, folding 'peasant knives'.

See also
 Penknife
 Higonokami

References

Pocket knives